Volkwin von Naumburg zu Winterstätten (also Wolquin, Folkwin, Folkvin, Wolguinus, Wolgulin, Middle High German: Volkewîn; died 22 September 1236) was the Master (Herrenmeister) of the Livonian Brothers of the Sword from 1209 to 1236.

Life and death 
Originally from Naumburg, Germany, Volkwin succeeded Wenno von Rohrbach, the first master of the order. Volkwin led the Sword-Brothers in the Northern Crusades in Latvia and Estonia against the Samogitians, Curonians, Semigallians, and Selonians. He was ultimately killed by the Samogitians during the course of the Battle of Saule in 1236. The surviving Sword-Brothers were subsequently assimilated into the Teutonic Knights led by Hermann Balk, becoming its autonomous branch, the Livonian Order.

References

1236 deaths
People from Naumburg (Saale)
Masters of the Livonian Brothers of the Sword
German military personnel killed in action
Christians of the Livonian Crusade
Year of birth unknown
Military personnel from Saxony-Anhalt